Joakim Norbeck, born 1965, is a scientist in molecular biotechnology at Chalmers University, Gothenburg, Sweden. He received his Ph.D. from Gothenburg University in 1996 on a thesis entitled "Protein expression of yeast during growth under osmotic stress",.
He identified the genes in Saccharomyces cerevisiae encoding glycerol-3-phosphatase (GPP1 and GPP2), as well as the genes encoding dihydroxyacetone kinase (DAK1 and DAK2) in the same organism.

References

Swedish scientists
1965 births
Living people
University of Gothenburg alumni
Academic staff of the Chalmers University of Technology